The Meaning of Art is an album by trumpeter Art Farmer which was recorded in 1995 and released on the Arabesque label.

Reception

The AllMusic review by Michael G. Nastos said "This is jazz that is relatively cliché and quote-free; not groundbreaking, but a consistent, professional effort. The release is a testimony to Farmer's endurance as one of the truly great jazz musicians of the late 1900s. Recommended".

Track listing
 "On the Plane" (Slide Hampton) – 5:17
 "Just the Way You Look Tonight" (Jerome Kern, Dorothy Fields) – 7:04
 "Lift Your Spirit High" (Hampton) – 5:18
 "One Day, Forever" (Benny Golson) – 6:30
 "Free Verse" (Geoff Keezer) – 10:35
 "Home" (Fritz Pauer) – 7:48
 "Johnny One Note" (Richard Rodgers, Lorenz Hart) – 7:36

Personnel
Art Farmer – flumpet, arranger
Slide Hampton – trombone, arranger
Ron Blake – tenor saxophone, soprano saxophone
Geoff Keezer – piano, arranger 
Kenny Davis – double bass
Carl Allen – drums
Fritz Pauer – arranger

References

Arabesque Records albums
Art Farmer albums
1995 albums